is the 24th single by Japanese entertainer Miho Nakayama. Written by Nakayama (under the pseudonym "Issaque") and Yoshimasa Inoue, the single was released on April 1, 1992, by King Records.

Background and release
"Mellow" was used by Este de Milord for a series of commercials featuring Nakayama.

"Mellow" became Nakayama's seventh straight No. 3 on Oricon's weekly singles chart. It sold over 169,000 copies and was certified Gold by the RIAJ.

Track listing

Charts

Certification

References

External links

1991 songs
1992 singles
Japanese-language songs
Miho Nakayama songs
King Records (Japan) singles